Astrakhanka (Astrahanka) is a village in northern-central Kazakhstan. It is the administrative center of Astrakhan District in Akmola Region. Population:

References

Populated places in Akmola Region